Mountain tea may refer to:

 Sideritis, also known as mountain tea or Greek mountain tea, a genus of flowering plants
 Gaultheria procumbens, a plant species also known as American mountain tea
 Mountain Tea State Forest - see List of Indiana state forests
 Mountain Tea, and other poems, a 1984 collection of poetry by Peter van Toorn

See also
 Leptospermum grandifolium, commonly known as the mountain tea-tree, a species of shrub or small tree
 High-mountain tea, several varieties of Oolong tea grown in Taiwan